Transformers: Combiner Wars is an animated web series developed by Eric S. Calderon, George Krstic, and F.J. DeSanto. Part of the Transformers franchise, it is the first installment of the Transformers: Prime Wars Trilogy, featuring elements taken from the Generation 1 continuity family and the comic books by IDW Publishing.

The series was co-produced by Machinima, Inc. and Hasbro's Allspark Animation for go90, and was animated by Tatsunoko Production. Prior to its launch, a set of four prelude videos was released that detailed some of the events which had transpired in this continuity prior to the start of the series.

Premise 
Four decades after the Great War between the Autobots and the Decepticons on Earth, the two factions have disbanded and a three-member ruling council rules in place of the absent leaders Optimus Prime and Megatron. An uneasy peace has been created on Cybertron, but the rise of the Combiners threatens to bring it to an end. Prior to the events of the series, Optimus Prime and Megatron have engaged each other in a final duel, while the new combiner Victorion has been born from the Enigma of Combination. The new ruling council consists of Starscream, Rodimus Prime, the Mistress of Flame (a new female Transformer from the planet Caminus); Caminus has been devastated by the Combiner Wars, which has set the formidable Windblade on a quest for vengeance. Windblade, once an official "City Speaker" to the gigantic "Titans" is tired of the bureaucratic non-action of the Council, who seem to sit idly while her people and her cities on Caminus perish. She decides that the only way to end the Combiner Wars is to take matters into her own vengeful hands.

Cast and characters 

Members of the cast were revealed at a panel at San Diego Comic Con 2016:

 Anna Akana as Victorion, a female Autobot Combiner who shares her name with a Brave Saga 2 robot.
 Jon Bailey as Optimus Prime, former leader of the disbanded Autobots.
 Michael Green as Metroplex, one of the legendary Titans for whom Windblade speaks.
 Charlie Guzman as Menasor, combined form of the Stunticons.
 Ricky Hayberg as Computron combined form of the Technobots.
 Amy Johnston as Maxima, a new character created for the series and ally of Windblade.
 Jason Marnocha as Megatron, former leader of the Decepticons.
 Lana McKissack as the Mistress of Flame, former ruler of the planet Caminus and current member of Cybertron's ruling council.
 Ben Pronsky as Rodimus Prime, Autobot member of Cybertron's ruling council.
 Patrick Seitz as Devastator, combined form of the Constructicons.
 Frank Todaro as Starscream, Megatron's former lieutenant and a member of the ruling council.
 Abby Trott as Windblade, vengeful female Transformer and former Cityspeaker.

Episodes 
The series consists of roughly five minute episodes.

Sequel 
On November 11, 2016, Machinima announced a sequel series titled Transformers: Titans Return. The series would premiere in 2017.

The cast introduced Peter Cullen as Optimus Prime, Judd Nelson as Rodimus Prime, Michael Dorn as Fortress Maximus, Wil Wheaton as Perceptor, Nolan North as Metroplex, Jason David Frank as Emissary, MatPat as Computron and Kari Wahlgren as Victorion. Meanwhile, Abby Trott, Jason Marnocha, Frank Todaro, Lana McKissack, and Charlie Guzman reprised their previous roles as Windblade, Megatron, Starscream, the Mistress of Flame, and Menasor from Combiner Wars.

References

External links 
Full series on YouTube
Full series on Rooster Teeth

2010s American adult animated television series
American adult animated action television series
American adult animated web series
Anime-influenced Western animated television series
Combiner Wars